Beta Lacertae (Beta Lac, β Lacertae, β Lac) is the fourth-brightest star in the constellation of Lacerta. Based upon an annual parallax shift of 19.19 mas, it is 170 light-years distant from Earth. At that distance, the visual magnitude is diminished by an extinction factor of 0.17 due to interstellar dust.

This is an evolved G-type giant with an apparent visual magnitude of approximately 4.43. It is a red clump star and the primary component of a suspected binary system, with the pair having an angular separation of 0.2 arcsecond.

Naming

References

G-type giants
Horizontal-branch stars
Lacerta (constellation)
Lacertae, Beta
Durchmusterung objects
Lacertae, 03
212496
110538
8538